Willits Municipal Airport , also known as Ells Field, is a public airport located three miles (4.6 km) northwest of Willits, serving Mendocino County, California, USA. This general aviation airport covers 75 acres and has one runway.

References

External links 

Airports in Mendocino County, California